"Girls of Summer" is a single by Aerosmith.

Girls of Summer may also refer to:

 Girls of Summer (2008 film), a film directed by Max Tash
 The Girls of Summer (2020 film), a film directed by John D. Hancock
 Satisfaction (1988 film), a film also known as Girls of Summer